Cyclopera is a genus of moths of the family Noctuidae. It is a native of South Africa.

References
Natural History Museum Lepidoptera genus database

Hadeninae